Grindelwald is a rural/residential locality in the local government area (LGA) of West Tamar in the Launceston LGA region of Tasmania. The 2016 census recorded a population of 965 for the state suburb of Grindelwald.

It is a small town just north of Launceston, developed in the style of a Swiss village by Roelf Vos, a Dutch immigrant to Tasmania, after he sold his "Roelf Vos" supermarket chain to Woolworths. It was built around an artificial lake, on the edge of which sits the 40 hectare Tamar Valley Resort, which shares the Swiss architectural style. The suburb was begun in 1980, and the resort opened in 1989

Grindelwald is the final stop of the annual TasGas cycling challenge.

In November 2013, it was announced that the town would be the site of a 103 million dollar eco-tourism project by developer Mike Dean.

History 
Grindelwald was gazetted as a locality in 1983. It is named after a village in Switzerland.

Geography
Muddy Creek forms the southern boundary.

Road infrastructure 
Route A7 (West Tamar Highway) runs along the north-east boundary.

References

External links
 Flickr tags

Towns in Tasmania
Localities of West Tamar Council